Radoslav "Rade" Radić (189017 July 1946) was a Bosnian Serb Chetnik commander (vojvoda) during World War II. At the start of World War II in Yugoslavia, he belonged to the Partisans, but in the spring of 1942 he staged a coup in which he killed members of his detachment headquarters and wounded Partisans, after which he formed his own Chetnik detachment, collaborating with the Nazi Germany and the Independent State of Croatia during the war. After the war, he was sentenced to death by the new communist authorities at the Belgrade Process and executed as a collaborator.

References 

1890 births
1946 deaths
People from Čelinac
Serbs of Bosnia and Herzegovina
Serbian mass murderers
Serbian people convicted of war crimes
Chetnik personnel of World War II
Executed Serbian collaborators with Nazi Germany
Executed military personnel
People executed by Yugoslavia by firing squad
People executed for war crimes
Executed mass murderers